This is a list of airlines currently operating in Aruba.

See also
List of defunct airlines of the Netherlands Antilles
List of largest airlines in Central America & the Caribbean

References

Airlines of Aruba
Aruba
Aruba
Airlines